Sanal Edamaruku (born 26 May 1955) is an Indian author and rationalist. He is the founder-president and editor of Rationalist International, the president of the Indian Rationalist Association and the author of 25 books and other articles. In 2012, after examining an alleged miracle at a local church in Mumbai, he was charged under India's blasphemy law, causing him to voluntarily exile to Finland.

Early life
Edamaruku was born in 1955 in Thodupuzha, Kerala, India to Joseph Edamaruku, an Indian scholar and author, and Soley Edamaruku. Born in a Christian-Hindu mixed marriage, he was brought up without any specific religious influence. At his parents' insistence, he was the first student in India whose official school records listed "no religion".

He became a rationalist-atheist activist at the age of 15, after seeing a neighbourhood athlete's death after her family refused medical treatment because they believed in faith healing.

Rationalist activism
Edamaruku has been active in the Indian Rationalist Association (IRA) from the age of 15. Before becoming the president in 2005, he served as the General Secretary beginning in 1983, and has been the editor of its publication Modern Freethinker. His many books and articles deal mainly with rationalistic thoughts and against superstition in India. His writings in Rationalist International are translated into English, French, German, Spanish, and Finnish.

In February 2011, Edamaruku was elected as a Fellow of the Committee for Skeptical Inquiry. (USA) and is an Honorary Associate of New Zealand Association of Rationalists and Humanists and Rationalist Association of UK (formerly Rationalist Press Association).

Edamaruku conducted investigation and campaigns in Indian villages, targeting mystics, god men and practices he deems superstitious. He refers to this as "Rationalist Reality Theatre." The documentary film Guru Busters shows Edamaruku and a team of rationalist campaigners on the road in Kerala demonstrations of how to perform supposedly supernatural stunts. He has helped in building Indian Atheist Publishers, which is now Asia's largest atheist publishing house. He convened the three International Rationalist Conferences held in 1995, 2000 and 2002. In December 2013, Edamaruku launched a new quarterly English language magazine The Rationalist on his blog.

The Great Tantra Challenge

On 3 March 2008, while appearing on a panel TV show, Edamaruku challenged a tantrik to demonstrate his powers by killing him using only magic. The live show on India TV where the tantrik chanted mantras and performed a ceremony received a large boost in ratings. After his attempts failed, the tantrik reported that Edamaruku must be under the protection of a powerful god, to which Edamaruku responded that he is an atheist.

Weeping crucifix investigation

In March 2012, Sanal Edamaruku investigated a report that a crucifix at Our Lady of Velankanni church in Mumbai was dripping water from the feet. This incident, though not recognised by the Catholic Church as a miracle, was believed by locals to be one. Sanal Edamaruku was invited to investigate by TV9 of Mumbai with the consent of the church authorities. He went with an engineer to the site where the alleged miracle had happened, and traced the source of the drip to the rear side. Edamaruku found that the water was seeping through the feet because of capillary action and faulty plumbing. Moisture on the wall where the statue was mounted seemed to be coming from an overflowing drain, which was in turn fed by a pipe that issued from a nearby toilet.

Comments and aftermath

During a television show held to discuss the investigation, Edamaruku accused Christian priests of regularly scamming devotees and defrauding miracles to make money, and build bigger and newer churches and convents, and the Pope of being "anti-science" and scoffed at Christians for worshipping the cross. A Catholic lawyer asked Edamaruku to apologise whilst on television, which he refused to do. Such defamatory statements lead to the Catholic Secular Forum filing First information reports under Section 295(A) of the Indian Penal Code in April 2012.

The All India Catholic Union said the law was being applied incorrectly. Colin Gonsalves, the founder of the India Center for Human Rights and Law, stated his opinion that no criminal offence had been committed. Vishal Dadlani, and James Randi publicly spoke in Edamaraku's defense while others accused Edamaruku of being "as much of a missionary seeking converts for his particular “ism” as the Church is for its own belief." The Catholic Archdiocese of Bombay, which was not associated with the criminal charges, called for Edamaruku to apologise and for the prosecution to drop the charges. Edamaruku refused and on 31 July 2012 moved to Finland.

Views
Edamaruku is a frequent critic of Hindu astrology and other practices he deems superstititious. He also has accused Indian Godmen of mostly being charlatans amassing wealth and property from supposed miracles.

Edamaruku also has been a critic of Mother Teresa, publicly attacking her legacy in Kolkata. He has spoken out against the Catholic Church's veneration of Mother Teresa and the miracle cure of  Monica Besra, who was reportedly cured after a medallion was placed on her by nuns. Edamaruku said that her cure could be reasonably ascribed to the treatment she received in a government hospital in Balurghat and the North Bengal Medical College and Hospital. After investigating her care record the former health minister of West Bengal, Partho De, has agreed her recovery was attributable to her months of medical care. Edamaruku describes the miracle as an "obvious fraud."

Edamaruku considers the Indian rationalist movement an "inspiring example for many western rationalists to awaken, activate and rejuvenate their own organisations", with India's rationalists being "on the frontline of the battle between science and superstition".

Edamaruku has been critical of India's blasphemy laws, describing them as "relics of colonial legislation" which have been abused to "hound and silence" intellectuals and artists who question religious beliefs. He considers it dangerous that any person may register a complaint of blasphemy against another, leading to an arrest and prolonged imprisonment until the suspect is acquitted by a court of law. Edamaruku argues that the real danger here is less the verdict and more the "pre-trial punishment".

References

External links

Sanal Edamaruku's home page
Indian Rationalist Association
Sanal Edamaruku on the Rationalist Agenda for the 21st Century
 "India's god laws fail the test of reason" Praveen Swami's article on Sanal Edamaruku on "The Hindu" newspaper

1955 births
Critics of Christianity
Indian atheism activists
Indian emigrants to Finland
Indian humanists
Indian rationalists
Indian sceptics
Indian secularists
Jawaharlal Nehru University alumni
Living people
Malayali people
People from Idukki district
Indian social commentators
University of Kerala alumni